The 445th Air Expeditionary Squadron is a provisional United States Air Force unit.  It was last assigned as a regular Air Force unit to the 321st Bombardment Wing at Pinecastle Air Force Base, Florida, where it was inactivated on 25 October 1961.

History

World War II
Activated in mid-1942 as a North American B-25 Mitchell medium bomber squadron, trained by Third Air Force in the southeastern United States.   Deployed to the Mediterranean Theater of Operations being assigned to Twelfth Air Force in Algeria in early 1943.  In North Africa, the squadron engaged primarily in support and interdictory operations, bombing marshalling yards, rail lines, highways, bridges, viaducts, troop concentrations, gun emplacements, shipping, harbors, and other objectives in North Africa.

The squadron also engaged in psychological warfare missions, dropping propaganda leaflets behind enemy lines. Took part in the Allied operations against Axis forces in North Africa  during March–May 1943, the reduction of Pantelleria and Lampedusain islands during June, the invasion of Sicily in July, the landing at Salerno in September, the Allied advance toward Rome during January–June 1944, the invasion of Southern France in August 1944, and the Allied operations in northern Italy from September 1944 to April 1945.   Inactivated in Italy after the German Capitulation in September 1945.

Reserve
Reactivated as part of the Air Force Reserve in 1947 and equipped with Douglas B-26 Invader medium bombers, then inactivated in 1949 due to budget cuts.

Strategic Air Command
Was reactivated in 1953 as a Strategic Air Command Boeing B-47 Stratojet squadron . Trained in air refueling and strategic bombardment operations with the B-47. in 1961, the squadron began transferring its B-47s to other SAC wings and became non-operational as part of the phaseout of the B-47.

Lineage
 Constituted as the 445th Bombardment Squadron (Medium) on 19 June 1942
 Activated on 26 June 1942
 Redesignated 445th Bombardment Squadron, Medium on 19 June 1942
 Inactivated on 12 September 1945
 Redesignated 445th Bombardment Squadron, Light on 26 May 1947
 Activated in the reserve on 29 June 1947
 Inactivated on 27 June 1949
 Redesignated 445th Bombardment Squadron, Medium on 25 November 1953
 Activated on 15 December 1953
 Discontinued and inactivated on 25 October 1961

Assignments
 321st Bombardment Group, 26 June 1942 – 12 September 1945
 321st Bombardment Group, 29 June 1947 – 27 June 1949
 321st Bombardment Wing, 15 December 1953 – 25 October 1961

Stations

 Barksdale Field, Louisiana, 26 June 1942
 Columbia Army Air Base, South Carolina, c. 1 August 1942
 Walterboro Army Air Field, South Carolina, September 1942
 DeRidder Army Air Base, Louisiana, c. 1 December 1942 – 21 January 1943
 Ain M'lila Airfield, Algeria, 12 March 1943
 Souk-el-Arba Airfield, Tunisia, c. 1 June 1943
 Soliman Airfield, Tunisia, 8 August 1943
 Grottaglie Airfield, Italy, October 1943

 Amendola Airfield, Italy, c. 20 November 1943
 Vincenzo Airfield, Italy, 14 January 1944
 Gaudo Airfield, Italy, February 1944
 Corsica, France, 23 April 1944
 Falconara Airfield, Italy, 1 April 1945
 Pomigliano Airfield, Italy, c. September-12 September 1945
 Toledo Municipal Airport, Ohio, 29 June 1947 – 27 June 1949
 Pinecastle Air Force Base (later McCoy Air Force Base), Florida,  15 December 1953 – 25 October 1961

Aircraft
 North American B-25 Mitchell, 1942-1945
 Boeing B-47 Stratojet, 1953-1961

References

 Notes

Bibliography

 
 
 
 

Air expeditionary squadrons of the United States Air Force